The canton of Frontenay-Rohan-Rohan is an administrative division of the Deux-Sèvres department, western France. Its borders were modified at the French canton reorganisation which came into effect in March 2015. Its seat is in Frontenay-Rohan-Rohan.

It consists of the following communes:
 
Amuré
Arçais
Bessines
Coulon
Épannes
Fors
Frontenay-Rohan-Rohan
Granzay-Gript
Magné
Saint-Symphorien
Sansais
Vallans
Le Vanneau-Irleau

References

Cantons of Deux-Sèvres